The Pyatt Tunnel is a historic railroad tunnel in Marion County, Arkansas. It is a  tunnel, hewn through bedrock beneath a ridge north of Crooked Creek and southeast of the city of Pyatt.  The tunnel's portals are unimproved, and the tunnel itself has no concrete reinforcement, unlike other tunnels on the White Mountain Division of the Missouri Pacific Railroad, which passes through it.  The tunnel was built in 1903–1904, and is one of seven railroad tunnels in the state.

The tunnel was listed on the National Register of Historic Places in 2007.

See also
National Register of Historic Places listings in Marion County, Arkansas
List of bridges on the National Register of Historic Places in Arkansas

References

Railway tunnels on the National Register of Historic Places
Transport infrastructure completed in 1904
Buildings and structures in Marion County, Arkansas
Tunnels in Arkansas
National Register of Historic Places in Marion County, Arkansas
Railway buildings and structures on the National Register of Historic Places in Arkansas